Parker LeGrand Jacobs (born July 17, 1975) is an American artist, musician and former child actor. He is known for his work as an art director on the children's television series Yo Gabba Gabba!, for which he has been nominated for four Daytime Emmy Awards, as well as for his involvement with the Californian bands GOGO13, The Aquabats and The Sandfleas.

Biography
Early life
Parker LeGrand Jacobs was born in Ogden, Utah in 1975, the third child born into a LDS family. His middle name is in honor of his great-grandfather, prominent Latter-day Saint leader LeGrand Richards. Following his family's relocation to California in 1976, Jacobs – like his older siblings Christian and Rachel and younger brother Tyler – worked as a child actor, appearing in numerous commercials and television shows in his preadolescence. His most notable acting work included a starring role on the sitcom The Cavanaughs, in which he appeared in every episode during the series' run from 1986 to 1989, and as the recurring character "Purdle the Turtle" on The Wonder Years. Jacobs retired from show business in 1991, and shortly thereafter moved from California to St. George, Utah with family members.

While living in St. George, Jacobs formed the ska band GOGO13 with his brother Tyler in 1993, where he assumed the role of co-lead singer and songwriter. Though GOGO13 became a notable local success, the original incarnation of the band lasted just under a year until Jacobs left Utah in 1994 to serve his mission for the LDS Church, spending two years in West Virginia. Upon his return, he moved back to California and became involved with his brother Christian's then-up-and-coming band The Aquabats, providing artwork for their logos, albums and merchandise, as well as contributing lyrics, various creative ideas and running their fan club. Most visibly, however, Jacobs played the role of "The Professor" in The Aquabats' music videos and stage shows, taking part in the band's onstage skits and occasionally supplying backing vocals. Additionally, under the stage name "Mel", Jacobs was the lead vocalist for The Sandfleas, The Aquabats' costumed surf-punk side project, and recorded an EP with them in 1999. Jacobs retired from The Aquabats in the early 2000s, though sporadically continues to design posters and merchandise for the band.

Recent activities
Jacobs joined Paul Frank Industries as an artist and graphic designer in 2000, eventually earning the title of Senior Design Director. In addition to designing the company's products, Jacobs was notable for writing and illustrating the company's very first children's book, Only in Dreams: A Bedtime Story, featuring the Paul Frank mascot Julius the Monkey. In 2005, he briefly worked with Josh Agel, the artist better known as Shag, to help develop a clothing line which never came to fruition.

That same year, Jacobs helped contribute art design for an independently filmed pilot called Yo Gabba Gabba!, a children's television series being developed by his brother Christian and his creative partner Scott Schultz. In 2007, the series was picked up by Viacoms Nick Jr. channel, prompting Jacobs to leave his job at Paul Frank to work full-time on the show. His various titles on Yo Gabba Gabba! have included character design, animation direction, set design, color styling, writing, composing, voiceovers, art direction and costume design, the latter two of which earned him three nominations for a Daytime Emmy Award. In the September 22, 2008 episode "Birthdays", Jacobs made an on-camera appearance in the "Cool Tricks" segment, showcasing his affinity for baking birthday cakes.

Jacobs served as a "creative consultant" for both seasons of The Aquabats' live-action television series The Aquabats! Super Show!, contributing ideas and bits of writing to each episode between his work as art director on Yo Gabba Gabba!. In 2012, Jacobs, alongside Christian Jacobs and Jon Berrett, created The Goon Holler Guidebook, a children's book about a Bigfoot and a wizard. Jacobs has expressed plans to pitch Goon Holler as a television series, and published the first of four children's books based on the concept, Welcome to Goon Holler, in November 2014.

Jacobs lives in Huntington Beach, California, and has two daughters and four stepsons. Since 2008, Jacobs has posted a drawing every day on his website in a feature he calls "Daily Doodles".

Discography

As musician

GOGO13 (all as vocals, ukulele and artwork)
 Demotape O' Fun (1994)
 The Jets Demos (1994)
 Toy Guns & Pixy Stix EP (1994) (unreleased)
 It's a Trap! EP (2002)
 House Ape Demo (2002)
 The Fluke Sessions EP (2004)
 RAAAAWR!! EP (2005)
 ¡Es Ploded!/Cereal 7" single (2009)
 I Like It! LP (2012)

The Aquabats
The Fury of The Aquabats! (1997) – backing vocals, album artwork, songwriting credit on "Idiot Box!"
The Aquabats vs. the Floating Eye of Death! (1999) – backing vocals, album artwork
Myths, Legends and Other Amazing Adventures, Vol. 2 (2000) – backing vocals, album artwork

The Sandfleas
Four Songs By Four Jerks (1999) – lead vocals, album artwork

As artist
Parker Jacobs has provided cover artwork and/or illustrations for the following albums, not including the albums listed above:
Mealticket – Misconceptions (1996)
The Insyderz – Skalleluia! (1998)
The Insyderz – Skalleluia Too! (1999)
Digital Unicorn – Theirs Travel Began and Loaded the Dream (2001)
The Insyderz – The Greatest and Rarest (2001)
Lederhosen Lucil – Tales from the Pantry (2003)
The Vandals – Internet Dating Superstuds (2003)
Josh Wink – When a Banana Was Just a Banana (2009) + Remixed and Repeeled (2010)Yo Gabba Gabba! – Music Is...Awesome!, Vol. 3 (2011)Yo Gabba Gabba! – Music Is...Awesome!, Vol. 4'' (2012)

Filmography

Acting

Production

Bibliography

Accolades

|-
| 2008
| Daytime Emmy
| Outstanding Achievement in Costume Design/Styling
| 
|-
| 2009
| Daytime Emmy
| Outstanding Achievement in Costume Design/Styling
| 
|-
| 2011
| Daytime Emmy
| Outstanding Achievement in Art Direction/Set Decoration/Scenic Design
| 
|-
| 2012
| Daytime Emmy
| Outstanding Achievement in Costume Design/Styling
| 
|}

References

External links
The Parker Jacobs Blog

The Goon Holler Book

1975 births
American graphic designers
American illustrators
American Latter Day Saint artists
American male child actors
American Mormon missionaries in the United States
American ska singers
Living people
Musicians from Ogden, Utah
People from St. George, Utah
Artists from Ogden, Utah
Latter Day Saints from Utah
Latter Day Saints from California
21st-century American singers
21st-century American male singers